Hansen House may refer to:

in Israel
Hansen House (Jerusalem), in Talbiya neighborhood

in the United States

Hansen House, a division of the original Chas. H. Hansen Music Corp., based in Miami, Florida
Peter Hansen House (Pierre, South Dakota), listed on the National Register of Historic Places (NRHP) in Hughes County
Hansen House (Racine, Wisconsin), listed on the NRHP in Racine County
Thompson-Hansen House, Brigham City, Utah, listed on the NRHP in Box Elder County, Utah
Peter Hansen House (Manti, Utah), listed on the NRHP in Sanpete County
Johnson-Hansen House, Provo, Utah, listed on the NRHP in Utah County

See also
Peter Hansen House (disambiguation)
Hanson House (disambiguation)